Philip Squires (born 18 June 1939) is an Australian cricketer. He played in one first-class match for South Australia in 1962/63.

See also
 List of South Australian representative cricketers

References

External links
 

1939 births
Living people
Australian cricketers
South Australia cricketers
Cricketers from Adelaide